Charlotte Ballet is the oldest professional ballet company in North Carolina. It was founded as North Carolina Dance Theatre in Winston-Salem by Robert Lindgren, who was then Dean of Dance at the University of North Carolina School of the Arts, in 1970. It moved to Charlotte in 1990 and rebranded as Charlotte Ballet in 2014. It currently has 26 dancers and is the parent company of the Charlotte Ballet Academy.

Artistic Staff 
 Alejandro Cerrudo - Artistic Director
 Douglas Singleton - Executive Director
 Patricia McBride - Associate Artistic Director & Master Teacher
 Christopher Stuart - Director of Charlotte Ballet II
 Traci Gilchrest Kubie - Rehearsal Director

Dancers

Company

Charlotte Ballet II

Trainees

Repertoire 
Charlotte Ballet has performed an extensive repertoire over the years. With two of the company's leaders, Patricia McBride and Jean-Pierre Bonnefoux having extensive ties to George Balanchine and Jerome Robbins and major contemporary dance choreographer Dwight Rhoden being the choreographer-in-residence, Charlotte Ballet has become a major hub for neoclassical and contemporary work.

George Balanchine 
 Agon
 Allegro Brillante
 Apollo
 Concerto Barocco
 Divertimento No. 15
 The Four Temperaments
 La Sonnambula
 A Midsummer Night's Dream
 Pas de Dix
 Raymonda Variations
 Rubies
 Scotch Symphony
 Serenade
 Square Dance
 Stars and Stripes
 Stravinsky Violin Concerto
 Tarantella
 Tschaikovsky Pas de Deux
 Valse Fantaisie
 Walpurgisnacht
 Western Symphony
 Who Cares?

Marius Petipa 
 Swan Lake
 Sleeping Beauty
 Raymonda
 Paquita
 Don Quixote

Jiří Kylián 
 Sechz Tänze
 Forgotten Land

Twyla Tharp 
 Nine Sinatra Songs
 The Golden Section

Alvin Ailey 
 The River
 Night Creature

Dwight Rhoden 
 The Groove
 Spun to The Sky
 Bop Doo Wah
 Alleged Dances
 Artifice
 Othello
 Peace Piece
 Sit In Stand Out
 Gateways
 Ballad Unto
 Broken Fantasy

William Forsythe 
 In the middle, somewhat elevated

Sasha Janes 
 Sketches from Grace
 Lascia la Spina Cogli la Rosa
 We Danced Through Life
 Shelter
 You're So Fine
 Queen
 Last Lost Chance
 Utopia
 Facsimile 
 The Weight of Darkness
 At First Sight
 Rhapsodic Dances
 The Four Seasons
 Dangerous Liaisons
 The Seed and Soil
 Chaconne

Alonzo King 
 Salt
 Map

Other Classics 
 Nutcracker (Choreographed by Salvatore Aiello, then Jean-Pierre Bonnefoux)
 Cinderella (Choreographed by Jean-Pierre Bonnefoux)
 Romeo and Juliet (Choreographed by Jean Pierre Bonnefoux)
 Carmina Burana (Choreographed by Jean-Pierre Bonnefoux)
 The Little Mermaid (Choreographed by Mark Diamond)
 Peter Pan (Choreographed by Jean-Pierre Bonnefoux)
 Wuthering Heights (Choreographed by Sasha Janes)
 Carmen (Choreographed by Sasha Janes)

Education 
Charlotte Ballet is the parent company to the Charlotte Ballet Academy, formerly the North Carolina Dance Theatre School of Dance. The school was founded in September 1993. By 1997, 3 satellite locations had been established to accommodate the then 5 level divisions and an Open Division. 
The school now offers a conservatory program, developed in 2004, for serious dance students who wishes to incorporate their dance classes with their academics.

References

External links 
 
 NC Dance Theatre's Facebook Page

Dance companies in the United States
Ballet companies in the United States
Ballet schools in the United States
Culture of Charlotte, North Carolina
Dance in North Carolina
Performing groups established in 1970
1970 establishments in North Carolina